is a railway station on the third-sector railway operating company Shinano Railway, in the city of Ueda, Nagano, Japan. The station also has a freight terminal for the Japan Freight Railway Company (JR Freight).

Lines
Nishi-Ueda Station is served by the Shinano Railway Line and is 44.4 kilometers from the starting point of the line at Karuizawa Station.

Station layout
The station consists of two ground-level island platforms, connected to the station building by a footbridge. However, only one side of one of the island platforms is used, giving the station a one side/one island platform configuration serving three tracks.

Platforms

Adjacent stations

History
It was renamed Nishi-Ueda on 10 April 1956.

Passenger statistics
In fiscal 2011, the station was used by an average of 1,764 passengers daily.

Surrounding area

Ueda Nishi High School

See also
 List of railway stations in Japan

References

External links
 

Railway stations in Nagano Prefecture
Railway stations in Japan opened in 1920
Shinano Railway Line
Stations of Japan Freight Railway Company
Ueda, Nagano